Max Decugis and Anne de Borman defeated Heinrich Kleinschroth and Mieken Rieck in the final, 6–4, 7–5, to win the inaugural mixed doubles tennis title at the World Hard Court Championships.

Draw

Draw

References

Men's Singles